Shawn Theodore (born 1970) is a Philadelphia contemporary artist, writer and photographer. Theodore's work focuses on a variety of photographic genres within the context of Blackness. His work is an intersection of visual and written narratives, illusory perspectives, and culturally significant photographic imagery and objects to speak to the importance and equivalence of historical and quotidian moments of African-American culture.

Theodore first came into prominence for his color-saturated, silhouette-focused street photography work. "I was drawn to the notion of what happens to the self as the objects, spaces, and places around you begin to disappear. In other words, what happens to the Black body and mind in vanishing Black neighborhoods?" The first solo exhibition of his street photography was of his first photography project, ‘The Avenues’ in 2015 at the Painted Bride Art Center in Philadelphia, as a part of Re-PLACE-ing Philadelphia which was supported by The Pew Center for Arts & Heritage.

His stated goal is the exploration of race, spirituality, patriarchy, matriarchy, and class structure within Black communities. He describes this further, stating that "My work challenges how identity is created by story, folklore, legend, and ongoing community conversation. I’m driven by the perseverance of hyperlocal storytelling and how it can be its own mythology, in this case, 'Afromythology.'"

In 2016 Theodore photographed a cover for Smithsonian Magazine a special edition issue titled, "Black In America". This issue was a four-part magazine cover project, the other covers were created by the artists Amy Sherald, Lorna Simpson, and Delphine Diallo. In 2019 Theodore was published in the New York Times for an article titled, "What Reparations for Slavery Might Look Like in 2019," which also included his original collage artwork. In 2019 Theodore photographed the cover image for Paper Magazine featuring American civil rights activist and football quarterback Colin Kaepernick. The issue featured photographed portraits of Kaepernick and several other prominent African American activists and entertainers such as Dr. Angela Davis, Tarana Burke, Taraji P. Henson, Yara Shahidi, The Exonerated 5, Indya Moore, Ava DuVernay, and Bryan Stevenson.

In 2020 a photo illustration by Theodore appeared in the February 2020 issue of The Atlantic alongside the article The Fight to Decolonize the Museum. In the February 2020 issue of The New Republic, a photo illustration by Theodore appeared with an article titled Bookerism and the Black Elite, Managing race relations from above. In April 2020, The New Republic published a photo illustration by Theodore of prominent civil rights organizer Stokley Carmichael. The image accompanied the article, From Black Power to Black Establishment—The curious legacy of a radical slogan. In 2021, Theodore gained national attention for publishing a 2018 portrait of the poet Amanda Gorman after her reading of the poem "The Hill We Climb" at the inauguration of Joe Biden.

Theodore's works have been exhibited at the African American Museum in Philadelphia, Mennello Museum of American Art, The Barnes Foundation, Steven Kasher Gallery, AIPAD, The Bakalar & Paine Gallery, Snap! Orlando, PRIZM Art Fair, Philadelphia Photo Arts Center, and the University of the Arts among others.

References

External links
 
Interview: Shawn Theodore, Yale University, Museumofinvisibleart.com, Nov 6, 2019
Shawn Theodore Uses His Camera To Preserve Fading Black Neighborhoods, Yay LA Mag, 2019
A Photographic Re-imaging of Black Past and Black Future With Shawn Theodore, MUSEE Magazine, Feb 2018
Shawn Theodore's Captivating Work Is An Exploration of the African American Experience, Ignant.com, March 6, 2019

American contemporary artists
Living people
Artists from Philadelphia
21st-century American photographers
1970 births
African-American photographers
African-American contemporary artists
20th-century African-American people
University of the Arts (Philadelphia) faculty